Judy Wilson may refer to:

 Judy Blye Wilson, American casting director
 Judy Wilson (actress), English actress
 Judy McIntosh Wilson, New Zealand sculptor and fibre artist